The second De Jongh-Elhage cabinet was the 27th and last cabinet of the Netherlands Antilles.

Composition
The cabinet was composed as follows:

|Minister of General Affairs and Foreign Affairs
|Emily de Jongh-Elhage
|PAR
|26 March 2010
|-
|Minister of the Interior and Constitutional Affairs
|Roland Duncan
|NA
|26 March 2010
|-
|Minister of Justice
|Magali Jacoba
|PAR
|26 March 2010
|-
|Minister of Labor and Economic Affairs
|Elvis Tjin Asjoe
||UPB
|26 March 2010
|-
|Minister of Education, Youth, Culture, and Sports
|Omayra Leeflang
|PAR
|26 March 2010
|-
|Minister of Public Health and Social Development
|Omayra Leeflang
|PAR
||26 March 2010
|-
|Minister of Traffic and Communications
|Patrick Illidge
|NA
|26 March 2010
|-
|Minister of Finance
|Ersilia de Lannooy
|PAR 
|26 March 2010
|-
|State Secretary of Constitutional Affairs and the Solidarity Fund 
|Shamara Nicholson-Linzey
|WIPM
||26 March 2010
|-
|State Secretary of the Interior
|Felix Thomas
||UPB
||26 March 2010
|-
|State Secretary of Justice
 Police Affairs
 Penitentiary Windward Islands
|Ernie Simmons
|DP
||26 March 2010
|-
|State Secretary of Justice
 Youth Correctional Facility
 Court of Guardianship
 Rehabilitation Foundation
|Dudley Lucia
|PNP
||10 June 2010
|}

 Ersilia de Lannooy stayed on as Minister of Finance for the PAR party at the request of that party's leader Prime Minister Emily de Jongh-Elhage, after PNP earned only one seat in the 2010 parliamentary election and was forced to accept a state secretary position in the central government.

References

Cabinets of the Netherlands Antilles
2010 establishments in the Netherlands Antilles
Cabinets established in 2010
Cabinets disestablished in 2010
2010 disestablishments in the Netherlands Antilles